Vanessa Parise is an American film director, writer, producer, and actress based in NYC, New York. Her first feature film Kiss the Bride won the Golden Starfish Award at the Hamptons Film Festival in 2002.  Her television movies, Perfect High and Drink Slay Love have been named by the Lifetime’s Broad Focus initiative. Parise has been nominated for Leo Awards for Best Direction for Lighthouse in 2015, for Perfect High in 2016, for Beyond in 2018, and for The Simone Biles Story in 2019. Her television movie The Simone Biles Story was nominated for Best Television Movie and Best Lead Actress by the NAACP Awards in 2019.

Career
Parise is currently the co-executive producer and directing producer on Charmed. She directed the Tim Kring series Beyond, for which she was nominated for a Leo Award for Best Direction in 2018, and episodes of the Amazon series Just Add Magic. She has also directed the new series Andi Mack. 
Born in New York City and raised in Rhode Island, Parise ended her pursuit of a medical degree at Harvard Medical School to venture into the business as actor/writer/director/producer on the feature film Kiss the Bride, starring Parise and Alyssa Milano. Parise followed this with the film Jack and Jill vs the World which raised money for the Cystic Fibrosis Foundation and then enjoyed a limited theatrical release. She has directed the television movies "The Unauthorized Beverly Hills 90210 Story", "Perfect High", and "Status Unknown". As a writer, she has sold multiple spec features including BFF.  Parise sold the pilot script The New Twenty to Freeform.

Nominations and honors
Parise received a 2019 Leo Award Win for Best Direction of "Simone Biles: Courage to Soar," a 2016 Leo Award nomination for Best Direction of Perfect High and a 2015 Leo award nomination for Best Direction of #POPFAN. She was named by Lifetime with their Broad Focus Top 5 Original Movies 2015, and by SheKnows as one of Ten Female Directors Breaking Stereotypes in 2014. Her film Kiss the Bride won the Hamptons Film Festival’s Golden Starfish Award for Best Feature. At Cinequest, she won the Director’s Award. She also won the Excellence In Filmmaking Award at Sarasota, Best Actress, and Best Score at Montecarlo, and Best Feature at RIFF.

Filmography

References

External links
 
 Vanessa Parise website

American actresses
American women writers
American film directors
American women film directors
Living people
Harvard Medical School alumni
Year of birth missing (living people)
21st-century American women